Sant'Andrea del Garigliano is a comune (municipality) in the Province of Frosinone in the Italian region Lazio, located about  southeast of Rome and about  southeast of Frosinone.

Sant'Andrea del Garigliano borders the following municipalities: Castelforte, Rocca d'Evandro, Sant'Ambrogio sul Garigliano, Sant'Apollinare, Vallemaio.

References

External links
 Official website

Cities and towns in Lazio